Sifting and winnowing is a metaphor for the academic pursuit of truth affiliated with the University of Wisconsin–Madison. It was coined by UW President Charles Kendall Adams in an 1894 final report from a committee exonerating economics professor Richard T. Ely of censurable charges from state education superintendent Oliver Elwin Wells. The phrase became a local byword for the tenet of academic freedom.

History 

In the 1890s, University of Wisconsin economics professor Richard T. Ely's philosophy and radical practice came under fire from state education superintendent Oliver Elwin Wells. Ely was known to be liberal and pro-union, having published a book on socialism. Wells protested Ely's socialist beliefs, teaching, and public speaking to UW president Charles Kendall Adams and the Board of Regents, who did not censure Ely. A committee appointed to address the charges produced a report that exonerated Ely upon acceptance by the regents. The report introduced the idea of "sifting and winnowing":

Ely later referred to the report as the "Wisconsin Magna Charta" for its guarantees of academic freedom in pursuit of truth. In Decades of Chaos and Revolution, Stephen J. Nelson contends that UW's sentiment on academic freedom had been set "well before" the 1890s. He added that the 1894 statement "sounds the trumpet of the fundamental principles of the academy: an unending, unlimited belief in the creed of academic freedom and inquiry." Ely's hearing was later dramatized in a 1964 television episode of Profiles in Courage, featuring actors Dan O'Herlihy, Edward Asner, and Leonard Nimoy.

The "sifting and winnowing" construction was coined by Adams, the UW president, who had defended Ely publicly and read his book. It was later invoked by UW–Madison Chancellor Robben Wright Fleming when responding to protestors during his tenure.

In a later incident, sociology professor Edward Alsworth Ross was censured upon inviting anarchist Emma Goldman to address his class. He did not share her beliefs, but supported her free speech. In memorial of the incident, the Class of 1910 created a commemorative "sifting and winnowing" plaque of the phrase in its context, which the regents rejected. After the Class appealed to area newspapers, the regents relented. The plaque was installed on Bascom Hall in 1915, where it remains. It was rededicated in 1957.

References

Bibliography 

 
 
 
 
 
 

University of Wisconsin–Madison
Academic freedom
Metaphors
English phrases